Franklin Kiermyer (born 21 July 1956) is a jazz drummer, composer, and bandleader.

Biography

Born and raised in Montreal, Quebec, Kiermyer first gained attention in 1994 with his album Solomon's Daughter, featuring tenor saxophonist and former John Coltrane bandmate Pharoah Sanders. Known mostly for his particularly expansive style of drumming and the passionate spiritual focus of his music, he has performed and recorded with spiritual musicians from other cultures, as well as many leading figures in jazz.

Having reached a turning point in his evolution, Kiermyer spent much of 2001 to 2010 in remote Himalayan regions of Nepal and India on various solitary Buddhist meditation retreats, following the instructions of his teacher Khenpo Tsultrim Gyamtso Rinpoche. His musical output during this time was minimal. Kiermyer has stated that he felt this period was instrumental in reaching his spiritual and musical goals.

Scatter The Atoms That Remain is Kiermyer's present band, founded in 2017 and originally composed of pianist Davis Whitfield, bassist Otto Gardner and saxophonist Jovan Alexandre. In May 2019, saxophonist Michael Troy replaced Jovan Alexandre, who left the band due to health issues. Saxophonist Emilio Modeste recorded a full album's worth of new music with the band in early March 2020 right before the COVID-19 pandemic made it impossible to congregate. This was released on vinyl LP in February 2022 as Emancipation Suite. In May 2020, tenor and soprano saxophonist Ben Solomon began working with the band. In June, Davis Whitfield assumed the responsibilities of Musical Director.

Between August 2020 and November 2021 (during the pandemic lockdown), Scatter The Atoms That Remain published a series 67 duo and trio videos mostly done by overdubbing on each other's improvisations while at their respective homes: Kiermyer on the tiny island he lives on with his family in Norway and Davis Whitfield at his home in New Jersey. The trio videos feature Kiermyer and Whitfield with a variety of guests, including Ben Solomon and guitarist Eric Schenkman of the Spin Doctors band.

Scatter The Atoms' first release, Exultation, was co-produced by Kiermyer and Michael Cuscuna, as was Closer to the Sun and Further.

Discography
As leader

References

External links
 Franklin Kiermyer
 Scatter The Atoms That Remain

1956 births
Living people
Musicians from Montreal
Anglophone Quebec people
Canadian jazz drummers
Canadian male drummers
Canadian male jazz musicians